Collège Notre-Dame du Perpétuel Secours is an all-male private Roman Catholic primary and secondary school founded by the Congregation of Holy Cross in Cap-Haïtien, Haiti in 1904.

Initially, four secular Catholic priests presided over the school. Also presiding over the school were the Brothers of Christian Instruction, who also presided over other religious and educational institutions throughout the Republic of Haiti. The school also has a long and involved history with the island's religious and political figures, archbishops and presidents. Over ninety percent of the students attend higher education, such as the Universite Notre Dame d'Haiti. 

There are approximately 1,000 students. The student-faculty ratio is 15:1. Most of the faculty's tenure-track faculty hold terminal degrees. The school is located on a 60-acre (240,000 m2) campus atop a mountain dominating the city of Cap-Haïtien, from which most students come. Students are required to take an entrance exam. They are encouraged to attend religious mass on Sundays. Although many students are commuters, the school is traditionally a boarding school. The campus is also affiliated with the Boy Scouts of Troupe Henri Christophe, named after one of the more famous heroes of the Haitian Revolution.

Although the college has a tradition of rigorous academia, it is also known for its excellence in athletics. The Collège Notre-Dame Department of Athletics and its athletes have won numerous regional and national awards, notably in football and basketball. The college's athletes, known as the Collegiens, compete in men's inter-scholastic archery, basketball, cross country, cycling, track and field, volleyball, tennis and soccer. The school also fields club sports in swimming, competitive arm-wrestling and karate.

Former President of Haiti Jean-Bertrand Aristide was educated at the school. In 2004, the school celebrated its centennial, with many alums from all over the world returning for the celebration, during which past and present students marched through the city of Cap-Haitien and returned to the campus for communal morning prayer.

External links
Official Website
"Collège Notre-Dame du Perpétuel Secours, Cap-Haitian" (Archive). Haiti Observer.

Educational institutions established in 1904
Holy Cross secondary schools
Schools in Haiti
Boys' schools in Haiti
Catholic secondary schools in Haiti
1904 establishments in Haiti